The 2016 Meath Intermediate Football Championship is the 90th edition of the Meath GAA's premier club Gaelic football tournament for Intermediate graded teams in County Meath, Ireland. The tournament consists of 18 teams, with the winner going on to represent Meath in the Leinster Intermediate Club Football Championship. The championship starts with a group stage and then progresses to a knock out stage.

The draw for the group stages of the championship were made on 8 February 2016 with the games commencing on the weekend of 9 April 2016.

Curraha were promoted to the middle grade after an 11-year exodus when securing the J.F.C. crown last year.

This was Walterstown's return to the Intermediate grade after 51 years as a senior club since being relegated last year.

Cortown were relegated to the 2017 J.F.C. after just 2 years as an Intermediate club.

On 22 October 2016, St. Colmcille's claimed their 2nd I.F.C. title when defeating Dunderry 1-12 to 1-6 in the final replay in Pairc Tailteann. After 3 minutes of the first match in the final, St. Colmcille's and Meath star Graham Reilly was sent off and was subsequently suspended for the final replay which made the seaside club's achievement even more commendable. The victory marked their return to the top flight after a 20 season absence.
After winning the Meath I.F.C. St. Colmcille's also made history by winning their first Leinster Intermediate Club Football Championship and became only the third Meath club to win this honour after Wolfe Tones in 2004 and Ratoath the previous season. They beat Rosemount of Westmeath in the final.

Intermediate Championship Format Change Proposals Rejected
Due to the lack of success of the Meath Senior football team in the previous few years, it was proposed to make the club championships more competitive by reducing the number of teams in each tier of the championship and then the number of teams in each group to provide more 'do-or-die' matches which in turn would provide more competitiveness.
On 18 January, the decision was made to cut the number of Senior clubs to 16 in 2017. This means that 3 of the 18 clubs would be relegated at the end of the 2016 season while the 2016 I.F.C. champions would make up the top 16. 5 teams would be relegated to the J.F.C. from the I.F.C. with the J.F.C. champions making up the 16 I.F.C. teams for 2017. In 2017, the 16 teams will compete in 4 groups of 4.

However on 21 March, a proposal from the Slane club to retain the status-quo format was accepted by 40 to 14 votes.

Team changes
The following teams have changed division since the 2015 championship season.

From I.F.C.
Promoted to S.F.C.
 Ratoath - (Intermediate Champions)

Relegated to 2015 J.F.C.
 Clann na nGael

To I.F.C.
Relegated from 2013 S.F.C.
 Walterstown

Promoted from 2014 J.F.C.
 Curraha - (Junior 'A' Champions)

Participating teams
The teams taking part in the 2016 Meath Intermediate Football Championship are:

Group stage
There are 3 groups called Group A,B and C. The 2 top finishers in each group and the third-place finisher in Group A will qualify for the Quarter Finals. The third placed teams in Group B and C will qualify for a Preliminary Quarter Final, with the winner earning a place in last eight. The bottom finishers of each group will qualify for the Relegation Play Off.

The draw for the group stages of the championship were made on 8 February 2016 with the games commencing on the weekend of 9 April 2016.

Group A

Round 1
 St. Colmcille's 5-14, 1-8 Syddan, Simonstown, 8/4/2016,
 Cortown 0-13, 1-9 Ballivor, Athboy, 9/4/2016,
 Ballinabrackey 3-8, 0-14 Nobber, Pairc Tailteann, 17/4/2016,

Round 2
 St. Colmcille's 0-16, 1-10 Ballinabrackey, Bective, 13/5/2016,
 Nobber 0-15, 0-13 Cortown, Moynalty, 15/5/2016,
 Ballivor 3-11, 2-11 Syddan, Cortown, 8/7/2016,

Round 3
 Syddan 1-8, 0-7 Cortown, Moynalty, 7/8/2016,
 St. Colmcille's 4-15, 1-13 Nobber, Slane, 7/8/2016,
 Ballinabrackey 1-2, 1-2 Ballivor, Longwood, 7/8/2016,

Round 4
 St. Colmcille's 2-17, 2-7 Ballivor, Pairc Tailteann, 14/8/2016,
 Syddan 0-14, 0-11 Nobber, Kilmainhamwood, 14/8/2016,
 Ballinabrackey 4-16, 0-7 Cortown, Athboy, 14/8/2016,

Round 5
 Ballivor 3-12, 2-11 Nobber, Athboy, 21/8/2016,
 Syddan 2-9, 1-9 Ballinabrackey, Trim, 21/8/2016,
 St. Colmcille's 0-14, 0-5 Cortown, Seneschalstown, 21/8/2016,

Group B

Round 1
 Oldcastle 0-19, 2-11 Walterstown, Kilmainham, 9/4/2016,
 Castletown 0-13, 0-8 Longwood, Pairc Tailteann, 10/4/2016,
 Trim 2-20, 0-10 St. Ultan's, Kilmainham, 10/4/2016,

Round 2
 Oldcastle 3-10, 2-10 Castletown, Carnaross, 14/5/2016,
 Walterstown 3-12, 1-16 Trim, Castletown, 30/7/2016,
 St. Ultan's 1-14, 1-12 Longwood, Pairc Tailteann, 30/7/2016,

Round 3
 Trim 6-16, 1-11 Longwood, Summerhill, 7/8/2016,
 Oldcastle 2-16, 0-11 St. Ultan's, Pairc Tailteann, 7/8/2016,
 Castletown 2-13, 1-16 Walterstown, Rathkenny, 7/8/2016,

Round 4
 Walterstown 4-27, 1-11 Longwood, Summerhill, 13/8/2016,
 Trim 4-16, 0-10 Oldcastle, Pairc Tailteann, 13/8/2016,
 Castletown 4-19, 1-7 St. Ultan's, Carlanstown, 14/8/2016,

Round 5
 Walterstown 2-22, 0-10 St. Ultan's, Rathkenny, 21/8/2016,
 Longwood 3-8, 1-10 Oldcastle, Kildalkey, 21/8/2016,
 Trim 0-16, 0-8 Castletown, Pairc Tailteann, 21/8/2016,

Group C

Round 1
 Dunderry 2-5, 0-9 Curraha, Summerhill, 9/4/2016,
 Donaghmore/Ashbourne 'B' 2-12, 1-6 Kilmainham, Walterstown, 17/4/2016,
 St. Michael's 1-10, 1-6 Drumbaragh, Pairc Tailteann, 23/4/2016,

Round 2
 Donaghmore/Ashbourne 'B' 1-11, 0-12 Drumbaragh, Pairc Tailteann, 15/5/2016,
 Curraha 4-12, 2-8 St. Michael's, Rathkenny, 15/5/2016,
 Dunderry 1-10, 2-6 Kilmainham, Athboy, 29/7/2016,

Round 3
 St. Michael's 2-16, 2-13 Kilmainham, Pairc Tailteann, 6/8/2016,
 Donaghmore/Ashbourne 'B' 0-12, 0-8 Dunderry, Skryne, 7/8/2016,
 Curraha 1-15, 2-7 Drumbaragh, Bohermeen, 21/8/2016,

Round 4
 Curraha 1-10, 0-10 Kilmainham, Pairc Tailteann, 13/8/2016,
 St. Michael's 2-12, 0-11 Donaghmore/Ashbourne 'B', Seneschalstown, 13/8/2016,
 Drumbaragh 1-11, 0-14 Dunderry, Kilmainham, 14/8/2016,

Round 5
 Dunderry 2-9, 0-11 St. Michael's, Cortown, 2/9/2016,
 Donaghmore/Ashbourne 'B' 4-7, 0-11 Curraha, Skryne, 2/9/2016,
 Kilmainham 2-17, 0-10 Drumbaragh, Kells, 3/9/2016,

Knock-out Stages

Relegation Play Off
The three bottom finishers from each group qualify for the relegation play off and play each other in a round robin basis.
The team with the worst record after two matches will be relegated to the 2017 Intermediate Championship.

 Game 1: Cortown 0-10, 0-9 Longwood, Simonstown, 17/9/2016,
 Game 2: Longwood 3-14, 1-10 Drumbaragh, Brews Hill, 23/9/2016,
 Game 3: Drumbaragh 2-12, 1-8 Cortown, Carnaross, 2/10/2016,

Knock-out Stages

Finals
The winners and runners up of each group qualify for the quarter finals along with the third placed finisher of Group A.

Preliminary Quarter-Final:
 Curraha 2-15, 1-15 Oldcastle, Moynalty, 16/9/2016, (A.E.T.) 

Quarter-Finals:
 Ballinabrackey 0-11, 1-7 Donaghmore/Ashbourne 'B', Dunganny, 23/9/2016,
 Walterstown 0-14, 0-11 Syddan, Pairc Tailteann, 24/9/2016,
 Dunderry 2-9, 0-7 Trim, Athboy, 24/9/2016,
 St. Colmcille's 1-17, 1-11 Curraha, Duleek, 25/9/2016,

Semi-Finals:
 Dunderry 1-12, 0-10 Ballinabrackey, Pairc Tailteann, 2/10/2016,
 St. Colmcille's 2-19, 0-16 Walterstown, Pairc Tailteann, 2/10/2016, (A.E.T.) 

Final:
 St. Colmcille's 0-12, 0-12 Dunderry, Pairc Tailteann, 16/10/2016,
 St. Colmcille's 1-12, 1-6 Dunderry, Pairc Tailteann, 22/10/2016, (Replay)

Leinster Intermediate Club Football Championship

Quarter-Final:
 Arklow Geraldine's Ballymoney 2-10, 1-16 St. Colmcille's, Pearse Park, 5/11/2016,

Semi-Final:
 Round Towers 1-7, 1-9 St. Colmcille's, Kildare, 12/11/2016,

Final:
 St. Colmcille's 0-13, 1-9 Rosemount, Pairc Tailteann, 26/11/2016,

All-Ireland Intermediate Club Football Championship

Semi-Final:
 St. Colmcille's 3-11, 2-13 Pomeroy Plunketts, Athletic Grounds, 29/1/2017,

Final:
 St. Colmcille's -vs- Westport, Croke Park, 19/2/2017.

References

External links

Meath Intermediate Football Championship
Meath Intermediate Football Championship